Tipton County is the name of two counties in the United States:

 Tipton County, Indiana
 Tipton County, Tennessee